Nemiscau Airport  is located  southeast of Nemaska, Quebec, Canada, along Route du Nord at km 294. It was built and is operated by Hydro-Québec to serve their large electrical substations of Nemiscau and Albanel. Air Creebec has scheduled flights to and from this airport at the discretion of Hydro-Québec.

The airport has one of the better gravel runways in the region. Lights are controlled by a ground radio operator, and thus the radio operator must be present for night operations (they typically go home while it is still daylight). Permission is required prior to landing private aircraft via telephone.

Airlines and destinations

References

External links
Transport Canada - Canadian Aerodromes

James Bay Project
Eeyou Istchee (territory)
Registered aerodromes in Nord-du-Québec